Charles William Hutchins (born March 29, 1931) was an American politician in the state of Iowa.

Hutchins was born in Guthrie County, Iowa. He attended Audubon High School and was a businessman. He also served in the Korean War in the United States Air Force. He served in the Iowa State Senate from 1977 to 1993, and House of Representatives from 1973 to 1977 as a Democrat. During his time in the Senate, he served as majority leader from 1985 to 1993.

References

1931 births
Living people
People from Guthrie County, Iowa
Businesspeople from Iowa
Democratic Party Iowa state senators
Democratic Party members of the Iowa House of Representatives
United States Air Force personnel of the Korean War